Clifton Hill Shot Tower is an 80-metre (263 ft) tall shot tower on Clifton Hill in Melbourne, Australia. Clifton Hill Shot Tower was built beside Alexandra Parade (Then called Reilly Street) with its associated factory for Richard Hodgson in 1882 to manufacture lead shot and resembles a chimney. The tower was operated by the Coops family, who also managed Coops Shot Tower, now located within the Melbourne Central Shopping Centre.

The shot tower is easily visible from both Alexandra Parade and the northern end of Hoddle Street. The shot tower is on the Victorian Heritage Register. Urban legend states that infamous Melbourne biker and gangster, 'Chopper' Read buried a body at the bottom of the Shot Tower, although this remains unproven.

"The significance of the Clifton Hill Shot Tower was confirmed by two of the world's leading authorities on industrial heritage. One is Sir Neil Cossons, the founder of the Iron Bridge Museum and former chairman of English Heritage. Cossons is widely regarded as Britain's leading authority on industrial heritage and has advised on matters of conservation and management widely in the UK and overseas. This has included the nomination of Japanese industrial heritage sites that represent the emergence of industrial Japan, 1850-1910, to the World Heritage Register in 2014.  He inspected the Clifton Hill shot tower with me on 1 May 2010, whilst undertaking a tour of industrial sites of Melbourne, and it was the highlight of his day. He has studied shot towers in many countries, and in his opinion, the Clifton Hill shot tower has the most distinctive design for a shot tower, due to its scale, design and patterned brickwork." Nigel Lewis,  Submission Regarding The East West Link}: Clifton Hill Shot Tower and Yarra Bend Park,  Evidence to Panel on East West Link Impacts, April 11, 2014

References

Industrial buildings completed in 1882
Towers completed in 1882
Buildings and structures in the City of Yarra
Shot towers
Manufacturing plants in Melbourne
Heritage-listed buildings in Melbourne
1882 establishments in Australia